Sorineuchora is a genus of cockroaches in the family Ectobiidae.

Description

Etymology

Taxonomy
Sorineuchora contains the following species:
 Sorineuchora viridis
 Sorineuchora shanensis
 Sorineuchora atriceps
 Sorineuchora bivitta
 Sorineuchora javanica
 Sorineuchora lativitrea
 Sorineuchora pallens
 Sorineuchora punctipennis
 Sorineuchora setshuana
 Sorineuchora undulata
 Sorineuchora bimaculata
 Sorineuchora hispida
 Sorineuchora nigra
 Sorineuchora formosana

References

Cockroach genera